The Fr. Conceição Rodrigues College of Engineering (CRCE; popularly known as Fr. Agnel Bandra) is a private engineering college in Mumbai, India.

History
The college was started in 1984 with a single course of production engineering with an intake capacity of 60 students. In 1987 the course in electronics engineering was started with an intake capacity of 60 students. In 1991, the course in computer engineering was started with an intake capacity of 60 students. In 2001, the course in information technology was started with an intake capacity of 30 students.

The institute is named after the late Rev. Fr. Conceicao Rodrigues.  Under the inspiration of its founder, the Agnel Charities (the trustees of the Society of St. Francis Xavier, Pilar) realized that their contribution to the process of nation building would be through the spread of facilities for technical education. They founded technical education facilities in Bandra (Mumbai), Vashi (Navi Mumbai), Verna (Goa), New Delhi, Noida, Pune, and Ambarnath (Thane).

Accreditation and affiliation
Fr. Conceicao Rodrigues College of Engineering (CRCE) is affiliated to the University of Mumbai. Directorate of Technical Education, Government of Maharashtra State (DTE) awarded an "A" grade to the college among various engineering colleges. In the social community it is regarded as one of the finest engineering colleges in Mumbai on account of its dedicated & disciplined academic approach, staff, infrastructure, research facilities, a strong alumni network & above all, excellent campus placements.

Extracurricular and student activities
The college hosts two festivals each academic year. The technical festival,"CResCEndo" was held in the odd semester but was shifted to even semester from the year 2017. It attracts participants from various engineering colleges in Mumbai.

The cultural festival, "Euphoria" (in the even semester) is an intra-college event only for the CRCEites. The annual cultural fest Euphoria is the most awaited event of the year.

Apart from this the college also hosts the Annual National-level Fr. Conceicao Rodrigues Memorial Debate.

Alumni

Suchitra Pillai - Actress, model, anchor and VJ
Mihir Joshi - Radio jockey, singer and television host
Chetan Shashital - Indian actor, voice actor and singer
Gaurav Sen - Indian youtuber, educator

References

External links
Fr. Conceicao Rodrigues College of Engineering
Student Council, CRCE
TEDxCRCE
Computer Society of India - CRCE Student Chapter
IEEE-CRCE Student Chapter

Engineering colleges in Mumbai
University of Mumbai
Affiliates of the University of Mumbai
Christian universities and colleges in India
Bandra